Laurence Equilbey (born 6 March 1962) is a French conductor, known for her work in the choral repertoire, and more recently as the founder and music director of the Insula Orchestra.

Equilbey studied piano and flute in her early life.  She undertook formal music education in Paris, Vienna, London and Scandinavia.  Her teachers included Eric Ericson, Denise Ham, Colin Metters and Jorma Panula.

Equilbey founded the chamber choir Accentus in 1991, and continues as its music director. With Accentus, she has conducted commercial recordings for such labels as Naïve. She co-directs the programme with Geoffroy Jourdain. Since the 2009–2010 season, Equilbey has been an associate artist, with Accentus, of the Ensemble orchestral de Paris.

Equilbey invented the "e-tuner", an electronic means of tuning quarter tones and 1/3 tones.  Outside of conventional classical music, she is a collaborator in the Private Domain project, which has included work with Émilie Simon, Murcof, Para One, and Marc Collin of Nouvelle Vague.

In 2008, Equilbey was made a Chevalier of the Legion of Honour.  In 2012 she founded the Insula Orchestra.  One of their goals is to perform the neglected works by historic women composers, such as Louise Farrenc.  In July 2021, Erato released their recording of Farrenc's Symphony nos. 1 and 3.

References

External links
 Official Laurence Equilbey webpage
 French-language biography of Equilbey from Accentus choir page
 French-language biography of Equilbey from Véronique Jourdain agency
   Interview with Laurence Equilbey published in the Kapralova Society Journal, 1 (Spring 2014)

1962 births
Living people
Musicians from Paris
French choral conductors
Women conductors (music)
Chevaliers of the Légion d'honneur
Commandeurs of the Ordre des Arts et des Lettres
21st-century French conductors (music)
21st-century French male musicians
21st-century French women musicians
20th-century French conductors (music)
20th-century French male musicians
20th-century French women musicians
Erato Records artists